Ula Ložar  (born 24 January 2002), sometimes known as simply Ula, is a Slovenian singer. She represented Slovenia with the song "Nisi sam (Your Light)" in the Junior Eurovision Song Contest 2014 in Malta. She participated in EMA 2019 with the song, "Fridays" where she placed 3rd.

Discography

Singles

See also
 Slovenia in the Eurovision Song Contest 2019
 Junior Eurovision Song Contest 2014

References

2002 births
Junior Eurovision Song Contest entrants
Living people
Musicians from Ljubljana
Slovenian child singers
Slovenian pop singers
21st-century Slovenian women singers